Neil Russom (born 3 December 1958) played first-class and List A cricket for Cambridge University and Somerset between 1979 and 1983. He was born at Finchley, Middlesex.

References

1958 births
Living people
English cricketers
Cambridge University cricketers
Somerset cricketers
Oxford and Cambridge Universities cricketers
British Universities cricketers